The Hawkesbury Herald  was a weekly English language newspaper published in Windsor, New South Wales, Australia for the Hawkesbury River community.

History 
The first issue of The Hawkesbury Herald was published on 24 April 1902 by William Henry Pinkstone and Frederick William Collison. Pinkstone and Collison published the newspaper until 1940. The newspaper continued to be published after 1940 until 1945 when it was merged into the Windsor and Richmond Gazette. The Windsor and Richmond Gazette is now published as the Hawkesbury Gazette. The newspaper was circulated in townships along the Hawkesbury River including Windsor, Richmond, Castlereagh and Marsden Park.

Digitisation 
The newspaper was digitised as part of the Australian Newspapers Digitisation Program of the National Library of Australia.

See also 

List of newspapers in Australia

References

External links 
 Hawkesbury Gazette
 
 Press timeline: Select chronology of significant Australian press events to 2011
 The birth of the newspaper in Australia
 Isaacs, Victor, Kirkpatrick, Rod and Russell, John (2004). Australian Newspaper History: A Bibliography
 Isaacs, Victor; Kirkpatrick, Rod, Two hundred years of Sydney newspapers: A short history, Rural Press Ltd.

Defunct newspapers published in New South Wales
1902 establishments in Australia
Publications established in 1902
Publications disestablished in 1945
Windsor, New South Wales
Newspapers on Trove